Ultra Australia is an outdoor electronic music festival that is a part of Ultra Music Festival's worldwide expansion, which has now spread to twenty three countries. Ultra Australia made its debut as a single day event under the Road to Ultra banner on 24 February 2018, and took place at the Sidney Myer Music Bowl in Melbourne, Australia.

History

2018 
The debut event as Road to Ultra Australia was a single day event held at the Sidney Myer Music Bowl on 24 February 2018 and consisted of one stage. International artists for the inaugural festival included Afrojack, Axwell, Carnage (DJ), Andrew Rayel and KSHMR. Local Australian artists who performed at the event included Will Sparks, Timmy Trumpet, Tigerlily (DJ) and Mashd N Kutcher. Over 17,000 attended the event.

2019 
Following the success of the Road to Ultra 2018 event, the organisers announced the festival would return in 2019 as Ultra Australia, a single day event in two cities, Melbourne and Sydney held at Parramatta Park and Flemington Racecourse. The festival consisted of three stages; The Ultra Mainstage, Resistance and a local artists stage the UMF Radio stage. International artists included Martin Garrix, Marshmello, The Chainsmokers, Illenium and Slushii. More than 40,000 attended the festival in Melbourne and Sydney.  Australian headliner artists included Will Sparks, Tigerlily (DJ) and Sunset Brothers.

The Resistance stage made its Australian debut at Ultra Australia. Resistance headliners included Adam Beyer, Dubfire, Nicole Moudaber and Joris Voorn.

2020 
After another successful event, the second edition of Ultra Australia was confirmed with Melbourne and Sydney again as host cities. Despite the Covid-19 pandemic outbreak beginning to cancel events globally, Ultra Australia 2020 was confirmed to still take place.  

The festival again hosted three stages — the Ultra Main Stage, Resistance, and a local artists stage.[11] Ultra Australia 2020 included artists Afrojack, Eric Prydz, Dash Berlin, DJ Snake, Zedd, Deborah De Luca, Eats Everything and Markus Schulz. Local artists Tigerlily (DJ), Mashd N Kutcher, Joel Fletcher and Sunset Brothers performed.

2022 
Ultra Australia returned on March 5, 2022, after a hiatus due to the COVID 19 pandemic. The festival returned to Melbourne only, held at the Sidney Myer Music Bowl.  The festival hosted three stages which saw international artists Alesso, Afrojack, Oliver Heldens and Steve Aoki perform. Will Sparks, Andrew Rayel and Deborah De Luca also returned to the Ultra Australia event.

See also 
 Russell Faibisch
 Ultra Music Festival
 Ultra Brasil
 Ultra Buenos Aires
 Ultra Chile
 Ultra Japan
 Ultra Korea
 Ultra Bali
 Ultra Singapore
 Ultra Europe
 Road to Ultra

External links 
 Ultra Worldwide
 Ultra Australia
 Ultra Music Festival
 Resistance

References 

Festivals in Melbourne
Festivals in Sydney
Summer festivals
Electronic music festivals in Australia